The finals and the qualifying heats of the women's 100 metre backstroke event at the 1998 World Aquatics Championships were held on Wednesday 14 January 1998 in Perth, Western Australia.

A Final

B Final

Qualifying heats

Remarks

See also
1996 Women's Olympic Games 100m Backstroke (Atlanta)
1997 Women's World SC Championships 100m Backstroke (Gothenburg)
1997 Women's European LC Championships 100m Backstroke (Seville)
2000 Women's Olympic Games 100m Backstroke (Sydney)

References

Swimming at the 1998 World Aquatics Championships
1998 in women's swimming